Yingzhou Ecological Park is an ecological park located in Xiaozhou Village, Xinjiao Town, in the south eastern Haizhu District, Guangzhou, capital of Guangdong Province, China.

History 
These include Lingnan fruits, Shixia longan, red carambola, wampee, lychee, guava and papaya.

See also 
Xiaoguwei
Guangzhou University Town

References

External links 
Yingzhou Ecological Park official website 

Parks in Guangdong
Tourist attractions in Guangzhou
Haizhu District